Sodium 1,3-dithiole-2-thione-4,5-dithiolate is the organosulfur compound with the formula Na2C3S5, abbreviated Na2dmit.  It is the sodium salt of the conjugate base of the 1,3-dithiole-2-thione-4,5-dithiol.  The salt is a precursor to dithiolene complexes and tetrathiafulvalenes.

Reduction of carbon disulfide with sodium affords sodium 1,3-dithiole-2-thione-4,5-dithiolate together with sodium trithiocarbonate:
 4 Na  +  4 CS2   →   Na2C3S5  +   Na2CS3
Before the characterization of dmit2-, reduction of CS2 was thought to give tetrathiooxalate (Na2C2S4).

The dianion C3S52- is purified as the tetraethylammonium salt of the zincate complex [Zn(C3S5)2]2-.  This salt converts to the bis(thioester) upon treatment with benzoyl chloride:
 [N(C2H5)4]2[Zn(C3S5)2]  +  4 C6H5COCl   →   2 C3S3(SC(O)C6H5)2  +   [N(C2H5)4]2[ZnCl4]
Cleavage of the thioester with sodium methoxide gives sodium 1,3-dithiole-2-thione-4,5-dithiolate:
 C3S3(SC(O)C6H5)2  +  2 NaOCH3   →   Na2C3S5  +  2 C6H5CO2Me

Na2dmit undergoes S-alkylation.  Heating solutions of Na2dmit gives the isomeric 1,2-dithioledithiolate.

References

Thiolates
Alkene derivatives
Sodium compounds